Ministry of the Interior is a government ministry of Slovakia. Since 21 March 2020, the Minister of the Interior has been Roman Mikulec. In the previous 2018–2020 government, the department was headed by Denisa Saková.

References

Government of Slovakia
Internal affairs ministries